{{Infobox television
| image                =
| caption              = 
| alt_name             = 
| genre                = Documentary
| creator              = 
| developer            = 
| writer               = 
| director             = 
| creative_director    = 
| presenter            = Jack Hanna
| starring             = 
| judges               = 
| voices               = 
| narrated             = 
| theme_music_composer = 
| opentheme            = 
| endtheme             = 
| composer             = 
| country              = United States
| language             = English
| num_seasons          = 
| num_episodes         = 
| list_episodes        = 
| executive_producer   = 
| producer             = 
| editor               = 
| location             = Columbus Zoo and Aquarium Powell, Ohio, U.S.A.
| cinematography       = 
| camera               = 
| runtime              = 
| company              =
| channel              = Syndication
| picture_format       = 
| audio_format         = 
| first_aired          = 
| last_aired           = 
| related              = Jack Hanna's Animal AdventuresJack Hanna's Wild Countdown 
}}Jack Hanna's Into the Wild is a reality television series about all different kinds of animals in their natural habitat. This series is hosted by Jack Hanna.

It began airing as part of The CW's One Magnificent Morning'' block on October 5, 2019.

External links 

2007 American television series debuts
2020 American television series endings
2000s American children's television series
2010s American children's television series
2020s American children's television series
2000s American documentary television series
2010s American documentary television series
2020s American documentary television series
American children's education television series
Nature educational television series
Television series about mammals
English-language television shows
Litton Entertainment